In Greek mythology, Metion (Ancient Greek: Μητίων, gen. Μητίονος) was an Athenian prince as the son of King Erechtheus and Praxithea, daughter of Phrasimus and Diogeneia.

Family 
Metion was the brother of Cecrops, Pandorus, Protogeneia, Pandora, Creusa, Procris, Oreithyia and Chthonia. His other possible siblings were Merope, Orneus, Thespius, Eupalamus and Sicyon. 

In some account, Metion's father was Eupalamus, son of Erechtheus, instead. He had sons known collectively as the Metionadae which probably include Eupalamus, Sicyon, and Daedalus (his son by Iphinoe). These mentioned sons are sometimes credited with other parentages.

Mythology 
The Metionids later drove King Pandion II out of Athens into exile. These usurping sons were in turn overthrown by the sons of Pandion: Aegeus, Nisus, Lycus and Pallas.

Notes

References

 Apollodorus, The Library with an English Translation by Sir James George Frazer, F.B.A., F.R.S. in 2 Volumes, Cambridge, MA, Harvard University Press; London, William Heinemann Ltd. 1921. ISBN 0-674-99135-4. Online version at the Perseus Digital Library. Greek text available from the same website.
 Diodorus Siculus, The Library of History translated by Charles Henry Oldfather. Twelve volumes. Loeb Classical Library. Cambridge, Massachusetts: Harvard University Press; London: William Heinemann, Ltd. 1989. Vol. 3. Books 4.59–8. Online version at Bill Thayer's Web Site
 Diodorus Siculus, Bibliotheca Historica. Vol 1-2. Immanel Bekker. Ludwig Dindorf. Friedrich Vogel. in aedibus B. G. Teubneri. Leipzig. 1888-1890. Greek text available at the Perseus Digital Library.

 Lucius Mestrius Plutarchus, Lives with an English Translation by Bernadotte Perrin. Cambridge, MA. Harvard University Press. London. William Heinemann Ltd. 1914. 1. Online version at the Perseus Digital Library. Greek text available from the same website.

 Patsi-Garin, Emmy. «Επίτομο λεξικό Ελληνικής Μυθολογίας», ed. Χάρη Πάτση, Athens 1969.
 Pausanias, Description of Greece with an English Translation by W.H.S. Jones, Litt.D., and H.A. Ormerod, M.A., in 4 Volumes. Cambridge, MA, Harvard University Press; London, William Heinemann Ltd. 1918. . Online version at the Perseus Digital Library
 Pausanias, Graeciae Descriptio. 3 vols. Leipzig, Teubner. 1903.  Greek text available at the Perseus Digital Library.
 Stephanus of Byzantium, Stephani Byzantii Ethnicorum quae supersunt, edited by August Meineike (1790-1870), published 1849. A few entries from this important ancient handbook of place names have been translated by Brady Kiesling. Online version at the Topos Text Project.
 Suida, Suda Encyclopedia translated by Ross Scaife, David Whitehead, William Hutton, Catharine Roth, Jennifer Benedict, Gregory Hays, Malcolm Heath Sean M. Redmond, Nicholas Fincher, Patrick Rourke, Elizabeth Vandiver, Raphael Finkel, Frederick Williams, Carl Widstrand, Robert Dyer, Joseph L. Rife, Oliver Phillips and many others. Online version at the Topos Text Project.

Princes in Greek mythology
Attican characters in Greek mythology